Giulio Boschi (2 March 1838 – 15 May 1920) was an Italian Cardinal of the Roman Catholic Church who served as Archbishop of Ferrara from 1900 to 1919, and was elevated to the cardinalate in 1901.

Biography
Giulio Boschi was born in Perugia, as the youngest of the eleven children of Francesco and Giusseppa (née Mancini) Boschi. His siblings included: Assunta (b. 1813), Gaspare (b. 1816), Piera (b. 1818), Flora (b. 1820), Giovanni (b. 1823), Alessandro (b. 1826), Ferdinando (b. 1828), Vincenzo (b. 1831), Cesare (b. 1832), and Nicola (b. 1835). He received both his first Communion and the Sacrament of Confirmation from Archbishop Gioacchino Pecci.

Boschi studied at the seminary in Perugia before being ordained to the priesthood by Archbishop Pecci on 25 May  1861. He then went to Rome to study at the Pontifical Gregorian University, where he obtained a doctorate in theology. Upon his return to Perugia, Boschi did pastoral work at the Cathedral, and served as episcopal master of ceremonies, apostolic missionary, prosynodal examiner, and canon penitentiary. He was made Archpriest of the cathedral chapter in November 1878, and Domestic Prelate of His Holiness in August 1880.

On 1 June 1888, Boschi was appointed Bishop of Todi by Pope Leo XIII, formerly Archbishop Pecci. He received his episcopal consecration on the following 11 June from Cardinal Carlo Laurenzi at Rome. He was later named Bishop of Senigallia on 29 November 1895, and promoted to Archbishop of Ferrara on 19 April 1900.

Pope Leo created him Cardinal-Priest of San Lorenzo in Panisperna in the consistory of 15 April 1901. Boschi was one of the cardinal electors in the 1903 papal conclave, which selected Pope Pius X, and was named Bishop of Comacchio, in addition to his post in Ferrara, on 7 January 1909. He later participated in the conclave of 1914, which resulted in the election of Pope Benedict XV. In 1919, he resigned as Bishop of Comacchio and as Archbishop of Ferrara (7 January). Boschi was made Cardinal Bishop of Frascati on 3 July the same year, and Camerlengo of the Sacred College of Cardinals on 8 March 1920, remaining in both posts until his death.

Cardinal Boschi died in Rome at the age of 82. His funeral was held at the church of S. Ignazio four days later, on 19 May 1919, and he was then buried at the chapel of St. Peter's Basilica in the Campo Verano cemetery.

References

External links
Cardinals of the Holy Roman Church
Catholic-Hierarchy 
Biography of the Cardinal Giulio BOSCHI

1838 births
1920 deaths
People from Perugia
20th-century Italian cardinals
Cardinal-bishops of Frascati
Roman Catholic archbishops in Italy
Bishops of Ferrara
Bishops in Umbria
19th-century Italian Roman Catholic bishops
20th-century Italian Roman Catholic archbishops
Cardinals created by Pope Leo XIII